The 1984–85 Maltese Premier League was the 5th season of the Maltese Premier League, and the 70th season of top-tier football in Malta.  It was contested by 8 teams, and Rabat Ajax F.C. won the championship.

The season saw the relegation of Floriana F.C., one of the most historic teams in Maltese football, for the first time in their history.

League standings

Results

References

External links
Malta - List of final tables (RSSSF)

Maltese Premier League seasons
Malta
1984–85 in Maltese football